HaMa'apil (lit. The illegal immigrant) is a kibbutz in central Israel. It is located near Ahituv within the jurisdiction of the Hefer Valley Regional Council.

History
The community was established in Hadera in 1938 by a gar'in group comprising Hashomer Hatzair members who had immigrated from Galicia, Poland, Germany and Austria. The group received training in Beit Zera, Ma'abarot and Merhavia. Most of the members were illegal immigrants (known in Hebrew as Ma'apilim) to Mandatory Palestine.

The kibbutz itself was founded on 2 November 1945, on land bought from the Palestinian Arab village of Qaqun.

Notable residents include Chaya Arbel, a German-born composer.

References

External links

Official website

Kibbutzim
Kibbutz Movement
Populated places established in 1945
Populated places in Central District (Israel)
1945 establishments in Mandatory Palestine
Austrian-Jewish culture in Israel
German-Jewish culture in Israel
Polish-Jewish culture in Israel